Sergeant Thomas Burk (August 7, 1840 to February 15, 1926) was an American soldier who fought in the American Civil War. Burk received the country's highest award for bravery during combat, the Medal of Honor, for his action during the Battle of the Wilderness on 6 May 1864. He was honored with the award on 24 August 1896.

Biography
Burk was born in Lewis County, New York on 7 August 1840. He enlisted in the 97th New York Volunteer Infantry. He died on 15 February 1926 and his remains are interred at the Lowville Rural Cemetery in New York.

Medal of Honor citation

See also

List of American Civil War Medal of Honor recipients: A–F

References

1840 births
1926 deaths
People of New York (state) in the American Civil War
Union Army officers
United States Army Medal of Honor recipients
American Civil War recipients of the Medal of Honor